Matthew Wilkie is an Australian classical bassoonist. He is Principal Bassoon with the Chamber Orchestra of Europe (COE) and Principal Emeritus Bassoon with the Sydney Symphony Orchestra. He has made a substantial number of recordings, notably with the COE, in both a full orchestra and as a member of the Wind Soloists of the Chamber Orchestra of Europe.

Wilkie studied with Klaus Thunemann at the Hochschule für Musik und Theater Hannover.

James Ledger wrote Outposts, a bassoon concerto, for Wilkie, which Wilkie premiered with the Sydney Symphony Orchestra in 2011.

References

External links
 

Living people
Year of birth missing (living people)
Australian classical bassoonists